Thoon is a genus of skippers in the family Hesperiidae.

Species
Recognised species include:
 Thoon modius (Mabille, 1889)

References

Natural History Museum Lepidoptera genus database

Hesperiinae
Hesperiidae genera